"Red Rag Top" is a song written by Jason White and recorded by American country music artist Tim McGraw. It was released in September 2002 as the first single from McGraw’s album Tim McGraw and the Dancehall Doctors.  The song peaked at number 5 on the U.S. Billboard Hot Country Singles & Tracks (now Hot Country Songs) chart in early 2003 and reached number 40 on the Billboard Hot 100.

Background and writing
The song was written by Jason Sandbrink White in 1997 and released on his independent album in 2001. White told USA Today that it was a song about an abortion but not an "abortion song." He went on to say that he was "trying to tell a story about a relationship that didn't work out, period."

Content
The song's narrator recalls a past lover. He reflects on bittersweet memories from a youthful relationship, including a surprise pregnancy and the decision to get an abortion. This song was the subject of controversy due to the lyric that mentioned abortion, and some radio stations banned the song.

Critical reception
Rick Cohoon of Allmusic reviewed the song favorably, saying that the song is "wistful enough to have you tearing up right along with him." Cohoon goes on to say that "a simple and memorable chorus surrounded by innovative lyrics make this a recipe for success."

Chart positions
"Red Rag Top" debuted at number 34 on the U.S. Billboard Hot Country Singles & Tracks for the chart week of September 21, 2002.

Year-end charts

References

2002 singles
2002 songs
Tim McGraw songs
Songs about abortion
Song recordings produced by Byron Gallimore
Song recordings produced by Tim McGraw
Country ballads
Curb Records singles